Csaba László Borbély (born 5 July 1980) is a Romanian former professional football player of Hungarian ethnicity who played as a forward.

Honours

Club
Hutteen
 Syrian Cup: 2001
Oțelul Galați
 Liga I: 2010–11

References

External links
 
 

1980 births
Living people
Sportspeople from Oradea
Romanian sportspeople of Hungarian descent
Romanian footballers
Association football forwards
Liga I players
Liga II players
Nemzeti Bajnokság I players
Szombathelyi Haladás footballers
CSO Plopeni players
FC Astra Giurgiu players
FC Bihor Oradea players
FC U Craiova 1948 players
Ferencvárosi TC footballers
FC Progresul București players
ACF Gloria Bistrița players
ASC Oțelul Galați players
AFC Dacia Unirea Brăila players
Putnok VSE footballers
Romanian expatriate footballers
Romanian expatriate sportspeople in Syria
Expatriate footballers in Syria
Romanian expatriate sportspeople in Hungary
Expatriate footballers in Hungary
Syrian Premier League players